Georges de Wilde (25 November 1900 – 6 February 1996) was a French speed skater. He competed in five events at the 1924 Winter Olympics.

References

1900 births
1996 deaths
French male speed skaters
Olympic speed skaters of France
Speed skaters at the 1924 Winter Olympics
Sportspeople from Paris